Espora may refer to:
 Colonel (Navy) , an Argentine Navy officer during the Cisplatine War
 Comandante Espora Airport, named after the Argentine naval officer, located in Bahía Blanca, Argentina
 Comandante Espora Naval Air Base, an Argentine Navy air base co-located with the airport 
 , a class of warships in service with the Argentine Navy
 Several ships in the Argentine Navy, named after the Argentine naval officer:
 , a brigantine that served from 1865 to 1867
 , a torpedo boat that served from 1891 to 1916
 , a steamship that served between 1867 and 1878
 ARA Espora (D 21), a Fletcher-class destroyer (formerly ), transferred to Argentina in 1961 and decommissioned in 1975
 , a corvette in service since 1985, lead ship of her class